A by-election was held for the New South Wales Legislative Assembly electorate of South Sydney on 4 June 1887 because Bernhard Wise was appointed Attorney General in the fourth Parkes ministry. Such ministerial by-elections were usually uncontested. Most of the ministry was not required to face a by-election as they had been appointed prior to the general election in February 1887. William Foster had been the Attorney General however he resigned on the ground that he had been promised an appointment to the Supreme Court and Henry Stephen had been appointed instead.

Dates

Result

Bernhard Wise was appointed Attorney General in the fourth Parkes ministry.

Aftermath
With a margin of just 40 votes, William Traill challenged the result in the Elections and Qualifications Committee. The Committee consisted of 2 Free Trade members (William Trickett and Charles Garland) and 3 Protectionist members (James Garvan, Thomas Slattery and Henry Clarke). The committee scrutinised the ballot papers and held that Wise was properly elected, finding that the true result was Wise 2,611, Traill 2,571, formal 5,182, informal 62, total 5,244.

See also
Electoral results for the district of South Sydney
List of New South Wales state by-elections

References

1887 elections in Australia
New South Wales state by-elections
1890s in New South Wales